Deepti Sadhwani is an Indian actress and singer. She has done several music videos named Hariyana Roadways, Toot Jaayein, Lala Lala Lori and Butterfly Wale.

Early life and education
Sadhwani was born and brought up in Lucknow, India. She has done MBA in Finance from the Jaipuria Institute of Management. She also did CA and ICWA. She had worked as an investment banker in London.

Career
Sadhwani started her career as an investment banker. She won the title of Miss North India and she took part in Femina Miss India where she was a regional finalist. She has also appeared in the television series Taarak Mehta Ka Ooltah Chashmah and also hosted a reality show named Hasya Samrat, which was aired on Zee Marathi. She has also done movies like Nazar Hati Durghatana Ghati and Rock Band Party where she played the lead role. In 2020 lockdown she has done three music videos named Harayana Roadway, Toot Jaayein, Lala Lala Lori.

Filmography

Television
 Taarak Mehta Ka Ooltah Chashmah
 Hasya Samrat

Films
 Nazar Hati Durghatana Ghati
 Rock Band Party

Music videos
 Harayana Roadway
 Toot Jaayein
 Lalla Lalla Lori
 Butterfly Waale
 Tu Aag Ka Gola Chori

References

Living people
21st-century Indian women singers
21st-century Indian singers
Bollywood playback singers
Actresses in Hindi cinema
Actresses in Hindi television
Singers from Lucknow
Actresses from Lucknow
Year of birth missing (living people)